All Roads Lead Home is a 1957 West German drama film directed by Hans Deppe and starring Luise Ullrich, Christian Doermer and Fritz Tillmann.

The film was made at the Bavaria Studios in Munich. The film's sets were designed by the art directors Willi Herrmann and Heinrich Weidemann. It was shot using agfacolor.

Plot

Cast
 Luise Ullrich as Tilla Haidt
 Christian Doermer as Michael
 Fritz Tillmann as Dr. Jacobs
 Günther Lüders as Father Nehlsen
 Helmut Schmid as Autohändler Busch
 Lotte Brackebusch as Marie
 Sabine Hahn as Antje
 Sylvia Bossert as Irene
 Franz Schafheitlin as Grumke
 Georg Kostya as Kurt
 Alexander von Richthofen as Jochen
 Joseph Offenbach as Amtsschreiber
 Karl-Heinz Peters as Toboggan-Besitzer

References

Bibliography 
 Willi Höfig. Der deutsche Heimatfilm 1947–1960. F. Enke, 1973.

External links 
 

1957 films
West German films
German drama films
1957 drama films
1950s German-language films
Films directed by Hans Deppe
Bavaria Film films
Films shot at Bavaria Studios
1950s German films
Films scored by Bernhard Kaun